Strictly Come Dancing returned for its thirteenth series on BBC One with a launch show on 5 September 2015, with the live shows starting on 25 September 2015. Tess Daly and Claudia Winkleman returned to present the launch show and the live shows while Zoe Ball returned to present Strictly Come Dancing: It Takes Two on BBC Two. Len Goodman, Bruno Tonioli and Craig Revel Horwood returned as judges for their thirteenth series, along with Darcey Bussell who returned for her fourth series as a judge.

The series was won by The Wanted band member Jay McGuiness and Aliona Vilani on 19 December. McGuiness became the first celebrity since Louis Smith in series 10 to win the show without falling into the bottom two dance-off during the series, as well being the first since Kara Tointon in series 8 to win without achieving a perfect 40 score during the competition. Vilani also became the first professional in the show's history to win the show for a second time, after previously winning with Harry Judd in series 9, that would happen again in 2020 with Oti Mabuse but winning back to back that time. This series also saw long standing professional Anton du Beke reach the final for the first time, with Katie Derham, and Kevin Clifton becoming the first professional dancer to reach three consecutive finals.

Couples
On 23 April 2015, the list of professionals who were returning for the thirteenth series was revealed. Professionals from the last series who did not return included Trent Whiddon and Iveta Lukosiute. Robin Windsor, who had not taken part in the previous series due to an injury, did not return for this series, though he would be involved in the spin-off show It Takes Two. Alongside Windsor, Joanne Clifton would also be involved in It Takes Two, and would appear in the 2015 Children in Need and Christmas specials. She would also take part in the group dances during the series. Three new professional dancers were introduced: Russian dancer Gleb Savchenko (from the American, Australian, and Russian versions of Dancing with the Stars) and Italian dancer Giovanni Pernice replaced Whiddon and Windsor, and South African dancer Oti Mabuse (from Germany's Let's Dance) replaced Lukosiute .

On 10 August 2015, broadcaster Jeremy Vine was the first celebrity announced for the series, with more celebrities revealed throughout the month. The lineup was completed on 27 August 2015 on The One Show.

Scoring chart

Average chart
This table only counts for dances scored on a traditional 40-points scale. The additional points gained in the Week 10 "Quickstep-a-thon" are not included.

Highest and lowest scoring performances of the series
The highest and lowest performances in each dance according to the judges' scale are as follows (scores given by guest judges are deducted from the total).

 Ainsley Harriott and Daniel O'Donnell are the only celebrities not to land on this list.

Couples' highest and lowest scoring dances

Weekly scores and songs
Unless indicated otherwise, individual judges scores in the charts below (given in parentheses) are listed in this order from left to right: Craig Revel Horwood, Darcey Bussell, Len Goodman, Bruno Tonioli.

Launch show

Musical guests: Jess Glynne—"Don't Be So Hard on Yourself" & "Hold My Hand" and Gregory Porter—"Puttin' On the Ritz"

Week 1
 Running order (Night 1 – Friday)

Running order (Night 2 – Saturday)

Week 2
Musical guest: Rod Stewart—"Please"
 Running order 

Judges' votes to save

Horwood: Jamelia & Tristan
Bussell: Jamelia & Tristan
Tonioli: Jamelia & Tristan
Goodman: Did not vote, but would have voted to save Jamelia & Tristan.

Week 3: Movie Week
Musical guest: Andrea Bocelli—"Don't Cry for Me Argentina"
Running order

Judges' votes to save

Horwood: Ainsley & Natalie
Bussell: Ainsley & Natalie
Tonioli: Ainsley & Natalie
Goodman: Did not vote, but would have voted to save Ainsley & Natalie.

Week 4
Musical guest: Will Young—"Joy"
Running order

Judges' votes to save

Horwood: Kirsty & Brendan
Bussell: Kirsty & Brendan
Tonioli: Kirsty & Brendan
Goodman: Did not vote, but would have voted to save Kirsty & Brendan.

Week 5
Musical guest: Bryan Adams—"Brand New Day"
Running order

Judges' votes to save

Horwood: Jamelia & Tristan
Bussell: Jamelia & Tristan
Tonioli: Jamelia & Tristan
Goodman: Did not vote, but would have voted to save Jamelia & Tristan.

Week 6: Halloween Week
Musical guest: James Morrison—"Demons"
Running order

Judges' votes to save

Horwood: Jamelia & Tristan
Bussell: Jamelia & Tristan 
Tonioli: Jamelia & Tristan
Goodman: Did not vote, but would have voted to save Jamelia & Tristan.

Week 7
Musical guest: Seal—"Every Time I'm With You"
Running order

Judges' votes to save

Horwood: Kellie & Kevin
Bussell: Kellie & Kevin
Tonioli: Kellie & Kevin
Goodman: Did not vote, but would have voted to save Kellie & Kevin.

Week 8
Musical guests: Years & Years—"King" and Brandon Flowers—"Still Want You"
Running order

Judges' votes to save

Horwood: Jamelia & Tristan
Bussell: Jamelia & Tristan
Tonioli: Jamelia & Tristan
Goodman: Did not vote, but would have voted to save Jamelia & Tristan.

Week 9: Blackpool Week
Musical guests: Anastacia—"I'm Outta Love" and Take That—"Hey Boy"
Running order

Judges' votes to save

Horwood: Peter & Janette 
Bussell: Peter & Janette 
Tonioli: Peter & Janette 
Goodman: Did not vote, but would have voted to save Jamelia & Tristan

Week 10
Musical guest: Adam Lambert—"Another Lonely Night" and Il Divo—"¿Quien Será? (Sway)"
Running order

Judges' votes to save

Horwood: Kellie & Kevin
Bussell:  Kellie & Kevin
Tonioli: Kellie & Kevin
Goodman: Did not vote, but would have voted to save Kellie & Kevin

Week 11: Musicals Week (Quarter-final)
Musical guests: Josh Groban—"Over the Rainbow"
Running order

Judges' votes to save

Horwood: Georgia & Giovanni
Bussell: Georgia & Giovanni
Tonioli: Georgia & Giovanni
Goodman: Did not vote, but would have voted to save Georgia & Giovanni

Week 12: Semi-Final
Musical guest: Kylie Minogue—"I'm Gonna Be Warm This Winter"
Running order

For the Dance Off, Anita & Gleb chose to dance their Salsa, while Katie & Anton chose to dance their Waltz.

Judges' votes to save

Horwood: Anita & Gleb
Bussell: Katie & Anton
Tonioli: Katie & Anton
Goodman: Katie & Anton

Week 13: Final
Musical guest: Ellie Goulding—"Love Me like You Do"
Running order (Show 1)

Running order (Show 2)

Dance chart

 Highest scoring dance
 Lowest scoring dance

Week 1: Cha-Cha-Cha, Jive, Tango or Waltz
Week 2: One unlearned dance (introducing American Smooth, Charleston, Foxtrot, Quickstep and Salsa)
Week 3 (Movie Week): One unlearned dance (introducing Paso Doble and Rumba)
Week 4: One unlearned dance (introducing Samba and Viennese Waltz)
Week 5: One unlearned dance
Week 6 (Halloween Week): One unlearned dance
Week 7: One unlearned dance (introducing Argentine Tango)
Week 8: One unlearned dance
Week 9 (Blackpool Week): One unlearned dance
Week 10: One unlearned dance and Quickstep-a-thon
Week 11 (Musical Week): One unlearned dance
Week 12 (Semi-finals): Two unlearned dances
Week 13 (Show 1): Judges' choice and showdance
Week 13 (Show 2): Couple's favourite dance of the series

Ratings
Weekly ratings for each show on BBC One. All numbers are in millions and provided by BARB.

References

External links

2015 British television seasons
Series 13